Marc Stein (born 7 July 1985) is a German former professional footballer who played as a full-back.

Career
In January 2019, Stein agreed the termination of his contract with Energie Cottbus citing family reasons. He captained the club in the 2018–19 season and made 18 appearances in the first half of the season. He made 96 matches for the side, in which he contributed 13 goals and 7 assists.

On 25 January 2019, Stein then joined the reserve team of VfB Stuttgart on a contract until June 2021.

References

External links
 
 
 

1985 births
Living people
Sportspeople from Potsdam
German footballers
Association football defenders
Bundesliga players
2. Bundesliga players
3. Liga players
Regionalliga players
Tennis Borussia Berlin players
FC Hansa Rostock players
Hertha BSC players
FSV Frankfurt players
Kickers Offenbach players
Stuttgarter Kickers players
FC Energie Cottbus players
VfB Stuttgart II players
Footballers from Brandenburg